The McIntosh Presbyterian Church is an historic Carpenter Gothic style Presbyterian church located at 5825 Avenue F, corner of 7th Street, in McIntosh, Florida in the United States. The church was founded in 1885 as Center Point Church and the present building was built in 1907 and its name was changed to McIntosh Presbyterian Church on November 11, 1908. The church has gabled sidewalls facing each street. Each of these sidewalls features a large triptych lancet window. The main entrance is in a corner-facing bell tower set a 45 degree angle to the sidewalls.

In 1989, the McIntosh Presbyterian Church was listed in A Guide to Florida's Historic Architecture, published by the University of Florida Press. It is also a contributing property in the McIntosh Historic District.

McIntosh Presbyterian Church is still an active church in the Presbytery of St. Augustine. Thomas Lane is currently its Commissioned Lay Pastor.

References 

Carpenter Gothic church buildings in Florida
Churches in Marion County, Florida
Presbyterian churches in Florida
1907 establishments in Florida
Churches completed in 1907
Wooden churches in Florida